Martie Cook is an American television screenwriter, producer and teacher. She developed and teaches the screenwriting program at Emerson College.

Background
Cook worked as a writer and producer of television and film for ABC, NBC, CBS, and PBS as well as for Warner Bros., 20th Century Fox, Columbia Pictures, and Universal Studios. She has written for series such as Full House, Charles in Charge, Joe's Life and Rysher Entertainment's One West Waikiki. Cook has also served as a writer & producer for Entertainment Tonight, America's Most Wanted, NBC Nightly News, The Today Show, Better Homes and Gardens, and the PBS Emmy-award winning Zoom.

Cook is author of the screenwriting guide, Write To TV: Out of Your Head and Onto the Screen, which covers an extensive range of television writing styles and techniques. It's derived from her teaching experiences at Emerson. She also teaches on Series Mania Writers' Campus, with fellow television writer Sarah Treem, a week-long intensive on television drama.

Selected credits

Television

References

External links
Martie Cook at the Internet Movie Database

American women screenwriters
American screenwriters
Living people
American women dramatists and playwrights
American television writers
Screenwriting instructors
American women television writers
Year of birth missing (living people)